Péter R. Surján (born August 30, 1955) is a Hungarian theoretical chemist who is known for his research on application of the theory of second quantization in quantum chemistry.
In 2016 a festschrift from Theoretical Chemistry Accounts journal was published in his name which is also published as a book in Highlights in Theoretical Chemistry series by the Springer Nature. He is currently a professor and a former dean of the Faculty of Science of the Eötvös Loránd University.

Academic career

Education
Master's Degree in Physics: 1978 (Eötvös Loránd University)
Doctorate in quantum chemistry: 1981 (Eötvös Loránd University)

Employment
 1990-1995: Senior researcher at the Institute of Physics, Technical University of Budapest
 1991-1998: Associate professor at the Department of Theoretical Chemistry, Eötvös Loránd University
 1998-: Full professor at the Department of Theoretical Chemistry, Eötvös Loránd University
 2007-2012: Director of the Bolyai College, Eötvös Loránd University
 2008-2012: Director of the Institute of Chemistry, Eötvös Loránd University
 2012-: Dean, Faculty of Science, Eötvös Loránd University

Honors
Candidate of Science: 1986 
 Doctor of the Hungarian Academy of Sciences: 1998

Publications

Papers
He has published more than 190 papers in his scientific career. His first paper is published in 1980:
 Optical Rotatory Strength Calculation by Evaluating the Gradient Matrix through the Equation of Motion, Theoretica Chimica Acta 55, 103 (1980); 

A few of the most important ones include:
Higher excitations in coupled-cluster theory, The Journal of Chemical Physics 115, 2945 (2001); 
A general state-selective multireference coupled-cluster algorithm, The Journal of Chemical Physics 117, 980 (2002); 
Computing coupled-cluster wave functions with arbitrary excitations, The Journal of Chemical Physics 113, 1359 (2000); 
An observable-based interpretation of electronic wavefunctions: application to “hypervalent” molecules, Journal of Molecular Structure: THEOCHEM 255, 9 (1992);

Books

Editorial activity
Member of the editorial board of the Journal of Mathematical Chemistry
Member of the editorial board of Interdisciplinary Sciences: Computational Life Sciences
Guest editor of International Journal of Quantum Chemistry

References

External links

1955 births
Living people
Hungarian chemists
Theoretical chemists
Eötvös Loránd University alumni
Academic staff of Eötvös Loránd University